Professor John Matthews (born 4 July 1930) CBE DEng, BSc, CEng, CPhys,HonFIAgrE, FInstP, FErgS, FRAgrS, Eur.Ing. was Pro-Chancellor of the University of Luton.

Career

Agriculture
An agricultural engineer, Matthews joined Great Britain's National Institute of Agricultural Engineering (NIAE) in 1959, He was its Director from 1984-1990, during which time it became known as the Agriculture and Food Research Council.

Matthews' research interests were in the health and safety of agricultural workers, including noise, vibration, posture and mental stress; and also in robotic systems development.
While at the Institute, he served as chairman on health and safety issues of the ISO and the Organisation for Economic Co-operation and Development.

He received the  Royal Agricultural Society Research Medal in 1983 and several international awards: the Max Eyth Medallion in 1990, Fellow of Accademia dei Georgofili in 1991, and Order of Agricultural Merit (Ordre du Mérite Agricole) in 1992.

Higher education 
From 1989-1993 Matthews was Chairman of Governors at Luton College of Higher Education leading up to its achievement of university status in 1993. He then became Pro-Chancellor and Chair of Governors for the  University from 1993-1998.

Matthews was Non-Executive Director, Ceredigion and Mid Wales NHS Trust from 1993-2003 and its Vice Chairman from 2000. He chaired its research and development committee from 1993-2003 and its audit committee from 2000-2003. He also chaired the All-Wales workshops on 'The Assurance Agenda'.

References
"Matthews, John", Who's Who 2014, A & C Black, an imprint of Bloomsbury Publishing plc, 2014; online edition, Oxford University Press, November 2014

1930 births
Place of birth missing
Possibly living people
Academics of the University of Bedfordshire
Agricultural engineers
British engineers